Amy Frazier and Katie Schlukebir were the defending champions, but lost in the quarterfinals to Alina Jidkova and Tatiana Poutchek.

Nicole Pratt and Meghann Shaughnessy won the title, defeating Els Callens and Kimberly Po 6–3, 6–4 in the final.

Seeds

Draw

References
Main Draw

Challenge Bell
Tournoi de Québec
Can